was a Japanese folk rock band active from 1969 to 1972. Composed of Haruomi Hosono, Takashi Matsumoto, Eiichi Ohtaki and Shigeru Suzuki, the band's pioneering sound was regarded as avant-garde to most Japanese at the time. They are considered to be among the most influential artists in Japanese music. MTV described Happy End's music as "rock with psych smudges around the edges."

History

Career
When his band Burns needed a bass player, drummer Takashi Matsumoto reached out to Haruomi Hosono, a Rikkyo University student whom he heard was quite skilled. After playing shows together, Hosono eventually invited Matsumoto to join the psychedelic rock band Apryl Fool, which the drummer described as being influenced by bands like Vanilla Fudge, "really progressive sounds for the time." When their keyboardist, Hiro Yanagida, started getting more into music like Buffalo Springfield and the West Coast sound that was becoming popular, Matsumoto said Hosono got into it too, and "we started shifting toward that style." In October 1969, Hosono and Matsumoto formed a group named  right after Apryl Fool disbanded. In March 1970, Hosono, Matsumoto and Shigeru Suzuki contributed to Kenji Endo's album Niyago. The group changed their name to Happy End and were the backing band for Nobuyasu Okabayashi, performing on his album Miru Mae ni Tobe. The band began recording their own album in April 1970. Matsumoto stated that at the time Happy End started, they were influenced by Moby Grape, Buffalo Springfield, and the Grateful Dead.

Their self-titled debut album (written in Japanese as ) was released in August on the experimental record label URC (Underground Record Club). There were highly publicized debates held between prominent figures in the Japanese rock industry, most notably the members of Happy End and Yuya Uchida, regarding whether rock music sung entirely in Japanese was sustainable. Previously, almost all popular rock music in Japan was sung in English. The success of Happy End's debut album and their second, Kazemachi Roman released a year later, proved the sustainability of Japanese-language rock in Japan.

For their third album, also titled Happy End (this time written in the Latin alphabet), they signed with King Records and recorded in 1972 in Los Angeles with Van Dyke Parks producing. Although Hosono later described the work with Parks as "productive," the album sessions were tenuous, and the members of Happy End were disenchanted with their vision of America they had anticipated. A language barrier along with opposition between the Los Angeles studio personnel and Happy End was also apparent, which further frustrated the group. These feelings were conveyed in the closing track "Sayonara America, Sayonara Nippon", which received some contributions from Parks and Little Feat guitarist Lowell George. As Matsumoto explained: "We had already given up on Japan, and with [that song], we were saying bye-bye to America too—we weren't going to belong to any place." While the band officially disbanded on December 31, 1972, the album was released in February 1973. They had their last concert on September 21, 1973, titled City -Last Time Around, with a live album of the show released as Live Happy End the following year.

Post-activities
After breaking up, all four members continued to work together and contribute to each other's solo albums and projects. Hosono and Suzuki formed Tin Pan Alley with Masataka Matsutoya, before Hosono started the pioneering electronic music act Yellow Magic Orchestra and Suzuki continued work as a guitarist and solo musician. Matsumoto became one of the most successful lyricists in the country and Ohtaki worked as a songwriter and solo artist, releasing one of Japan's best-selling and most critically acclaimed albums, A Long Vacation in 1981. Happy End reunited for a one-off performance at the  concert on June 15, 1985, which was released as the live album The Happy End later that same year.

An album called Happy End Parade ~Tribute to Happy End~ and composed of covers of their songs by different artists was released in 2002. Hosono was involved in selecting the contributors and in Kicell's cover of "Shin Shin Shin", Matsumoto determined the cover art and title, and Suzuki participated in Yōichi Aoyama's cover of "Hana Ichi Monme". In 2003, their song "Kaze wo Atsumete" appeared in the American movie Lost In Translation and on its soundtrack.

Eiichi Ohtaki died on December 30, 2013, from a dissecting aneurysm at the age of 65. For the 2015 tribute album Kazemachi de Aimashō, commemorating Matsumoto's 45th anniversary as a lyricist, Matsumoto, Hosono and Suzuki recorded the previously unreleased Happy End song . A special two-day concert for the same anniversary was held at the Tokyo International Forum on August 21–22, 2015 featuring numerous artists. Matsumoto, Hosono and Suzuki opened each day by performing "Natsu Nandesu" and "Hana Ichi Monme", immediately followed by "Haikara Hakuchi" with Motoharu Sano. They also closed the shows with "Shūu no Machi", and finally "Kaze wo Atsumete" alongside a number of other artists.

The three surviving members of Happy End reunited again on November 5–6, 2021 for a two-day concert, that also featured numerous other artists, at the Nippon Budokan to celebrate Matsumoto's 50th anniversary. Also in 2021, Suzuki's band Skye recorded the unreleased Happy End song  for their self-titled album.

Legacy
Happy End are credited as the first rock act to sing in Japanese. Matsumoto later reflected that, "There were two strings of music back in the day. You had kayōkyoku, old-style Japanese pop music that had already existed, and then group sounds. There were bands tied to that latter movement like The Golden Cups and The Spiders, who were active in the Yokohama scene, which was a really interesting music community because it had a huge American influence owing to the navy base in nearby Yokosuka. Their singles would have an A-side, that was more like kayōkyoku, but the B-side would have something more psychedelic, more genuine rock. That gap between the two sides felt strange to me and the other members of Happy End, so we decided to not worry about whether what we created would sell. We just wanted to do something original. If you make something original, it's probably better to sing it in Japanese." Although, he did note that Hosono had initially felt that they should sing in English; "I think Hosono-san had the intention of wanting to do something that would go beyond just Japan. For me, I wanted to share something that was good about everyday Japanese life. That was the basis of my lyrics. It's something that's interesting to people even beyond Japan, but I actually think it would have needed a really good translator to connect."

According to music critic Ian Martin, Happy End pioneered a style of songwriting that combined Japanese-language lyrics with Western-influenced folk rock in a one-syllable one-note rhythmic form. In 2012, Michael K. Bourdaghs wrote, “For Matsumoto, the Japanese language was above all a source of raw material for use in experimentation. [...] for Happy End, the Japanese language functioned not as a repository of tradition or identity but as an alienated and alienating tongue — a source of noise.” Singer-songwriter Sachiko Kanenobu wrote that "they had a poetic way of writing that was never part of Japanese rock music before".

Happy End's music has been cited as one of the origins of modern "J-pop", with each member continuing to contribute to its development after the group's break up. The band is also considered progenitors of what would become the "City Pop" style. Masataka Miyanaga, Japanese music critic and founder and professor of Beatles University at Kanazawa University, wrote that, given the impact they had, it would not be an exaggeration to call Happy End the "Japanese Beatles". Matsumoto said, "We literally had no promotion, and they stopped selling our albums shortly after they came out — everything afterward was a re-issue. But the important thing about Happy End is that parents show it to their kids. Older workers show it to new co-workers. The older students share it with younger classmates. That's how our music has passed down."

In 2003, Happy End were ranked by HMV Japan at number 4 on their list of the 100 most important Japanese pop acts. Ohtaki and Hosono also appear on the list as solo artists, ranked number 9 and 44 respectively. In September 2007, Rolling Stone Japan named Kazemachi Roman the greatest Japanese rock album of all time. It was also named number 15 on Bounces 2009 list of 54 Standard Japanese Rock Albums.

Members
 – bass, vocals, keyboards, guitar
 – guitar, vocals
 – guitar, vocals
 – drums, main lyricist

Discography

Studio albums 

Happy End (February 25, 1973)

Live albums

The Happy End (recorded 6/15/1985, released September 5, 1985)

Compilations

Singles

See also
Music of Japan
Japanese rock

References 

Japanese rock music groups
Japanese psychedelic rock music groups
Japanese experimental musical groups
Folk rock groups
Musical groups established in 1969
Musical groups disestablished in 1972
Musical quartets
Musical groups from Tokyo